The Moto Guzzi V1000 Convert was a motorcycle made by Moto Guzzi at Mandello del Lario, Italy.  The designers at Moto Guzzi were aiming the V1000 Convert at the US police motorcycle market and were the first to produce a big capacity automatic motorcycle with shaft drive.

The "Convert" name referred to the torque converter which fed engine power to a conventional clutch. The clutch had to be used to shift between two speeds but the torque converter enabled the bike to stop in either gear and accelerate smoothly without using the clutch.

References

Links

Convert 1000
Standard motorcycles
Motorcycles introduced in 1975